Girls Orchestra (Spanish:Orquesta de señoritas) is a 1941 Argentine musical comedy film directed by Luis César Amadori and starring Niní Marshall, Francisco Álvarez and Zully Moreno.

The film's art direction was by Raúl Soldi.

Cast
 Niní Marshall as Nina / Giovannina
 Francisco Álvarez as Don Francisco Sánchez
 Zully Moreno as Blanca
 Victoria Cuenca 
 Arturo Bamio 
 Héctor Vozza 
 Pedro Quartucci as Rodolfo Sánchez
 Semillita 
 Judith Sulian 
 Julio Renato
 Morena Chiolo 
 Ambrosio Radrizzani 
 Pedro Porzio

References

Bibliography 
 Abel Posadas. Niní Marshall: desde un ayer lejano. Ediciones Colihue SRL, 1993.

External links 
 

1941 films
1941 musical comedy films
1940s Spanish-language films
Films directed by Luis César Amadori
Argentine black-and-white films
Argentine musical comedy films
1940s Argentine films